Jose Alves Borges is a Brazilian football manager, who currently manages Nagaworld of the C-League. He is known to have managed many other successful teams especially in the Thai Premier League. He was named the Best Head Coach by the Thai Premier League in the 2004-2005 season and by the Myanmar National League in 2012.

References

Living people
Brazilian football managers
1954 births
Sportspeople from São Paulo